Adrián Luciano Santos Sahibeddine (born 24 August 1994) is a French professional footballer who plays as a midfielder for French club Stade Bordelais.

Professional career
Sahibeddine began playing football with his local sides Gradignan FC and RC Bordeaux before taking a four-year break to focus on his studies. He joined Mérignac Arlac's academy in 2010, and after a couple years his Chilean mother connected him with her cousin who worked for the Chilean club Colo-Colo. He signed with Colo-Colo, but was plagued by injuries and homesickness, and declined professional contract to return to France.

After four months of not playing, he re-signed with Mérignac Arlac in the Division d'Honneur (the sixth division of France). In his first match against Sarlat FC, Sahibeddine ruptured ligaments in his knee and ankle and was out for 5 months. He finished the last 7 games of the season with Arlac and barely missed promotion, and Sahibeddine was convinced by his coach Antoine Vergès to remain another year. The following season, Sahibeddine helped Arlac get promoted to the Championnat National 3, finishing as one of the top scorers with 11 goals in 33 games.

After his success with Merlac, Ligue 1 club Dijon offered Sahibeddine a trial and was subsequently offered a one-year contract. Sahibeddine joined the reserve side of Dijon, with the goal of getting into the first-team in the summer of 2017. After success with Dijon's reserve side, Sahibeddine made his professional debut with the senior Dijon team in a 3–1 Ligue 1 loss to Bordeaux on 28 April 2018.

Personal life
Sahibeddine was born in Bordeaux, France to a Brazilian father, and a Chilean mother of Moroccan descent. As such, he is available to represent Morocco, Chile, Brazil and France.

References

External links
 
 LFP Profile
 Foot-National Profile
 Dijon Profile

1994 births
Living people
Footballers from Bordeaux
Association football midfielders
French people of Brazilian descent
French people of Chilean descent
French sportspeople of Moroccan descent
Dijon FCO players
Colo-Colo B footballers
Ligue 1 players
Championnat National 3 players
Segunda División Profesional de Chile players
French footballers